Kumamoto Kenmin Televisions Co., Ltd. is a Japanese television station, founded in 1982 and headquartered in Kumamoto, Japan. It is affiliated with the NNN and NNS, and it is the 3rd commercial television station in Kumamoto prefecture.  It started digital television broadcasting in 2006.  In 2016, Kumamoto Kenmin Televisions completed its new headquarter.  KKT started use its current logo in 2017

References

Nippon News Network
Television stations in Japan
Television channels and stations established in 1982